A petroleum technician is a professional that has two specializations within itself: petroleum equipment installer and petroleum service technician. Work performed within this profession revolves around the petroleum industry, and more specifically with fuel filling and service stations, as well as underground fuel tanks.

In Canada, the term used is a "Petroleum Mechanic", broken down into four different specializations: PM1 (servicing and installing of pumps and dispensers), PM2 (servicing and installing underground equipment), PM3 (servicing and installing aboveground storage tanks and associated equipment), PM4 (servicing and installing aboveground storage tanks and equipment with a capacity of less than 5000 L), and lastly a PHM (a Petroleum Mechanics Helper), who has to work under the supervision of a licensed Petroleum Mechanic.

The key work of a Petroleum Service Technician consists of installing, repairing, and maintaining dispensers, as well as installing and maintaining point of sale systems. Petroleum Equipment Installer works on the other side of the trade by installing above and underground storage tanks, and all the piping pumping fuel to and from dispensers.

Due to the products handled in the equipment serviced, Petroleum Technicians must conform to a range of federal, provincial, and municipal regulations in the performance of their tasks. They must have skills and knowledge to maintain a safe work site and prevent any damage to the environment.

This work has been completed on many service stations since the start of gas stations, but only now has this type of work been recognized and transformed into a certified trade.

Education 
All manufacturers require training and certification.
 Gilbarco dispenser training is about 20–24 hours online followed by a one-week sit-in course.

"Veeder Root" training is another key certification in the trade.
 Veeder Root is a tank and leak detection system and is used at most gas stations.
 There are four levels of v/r, level 1 is online, 2&3 is a one-week course (certification expires every 2 years), level four is an online renewal.

Various point-of-sales systems certifications such as:
 Verifone Sapphire
 Gilbarco Passport
 Bulloch
 Wayne Nucleus

Weights and Measures Inspector certification
 One must have this certification to perform initial inspections on pumps and dispensers.

Safety certifications
 American Petroleum Institute (API)
 Petroleum Oriented Safety Training (POST)
 Transportation of Dangerous Goods (TDG)
 Confined Space
 First Aid
 Work at Heights
 EWP (Elevated work Platforms)

Government certification web sites
 Government of Canada's Red Seal
 Government of British Columbia's Industry Training Authority
 Government of British Columbia's Construction Industry Training Organisation

Training institution
 The UA Piping Industry College of British Columbia (UAPICBC) offers technical training for this trade, which encompasses both theoretical and technical training, as well as access to government examinations and testing. Prior to January 1, 2012 the UA Piping Industry College of British Columbia did business as the Piping Industry Apprenticeship Board (PIAB).

Petroleum Mechanic training may be obtained through the Ontario Petroleum Contractors Association (www.opcaonline.org) or the Canadian Petroleum Contractors Association ( www.cpcaonline.com), Both of which offer home study classes with in-class review session before the regulatory exams.
The trade is not a Red Seal trade in Canada with each province determining its own standards.

In Ontario, the trade is licensed by the Technical Standard and Safety Authority.

Site-specific certification web sites
 American Petroleum Institute
 Petroleum Oriented Safety Training
 Transport of Dangerous Goods
 Confined Space Training
 Technical Standards and Safety Authority

Safety 
Safe Work practices: a summary of how and when to perform safe work practices on site and also appropriate certain safe practices in the event of several potential dangers.
 Setting up and maintaining a safe work zone, handling hazardous materials, mitigation of the potential hazards civilian traffic and operators present, recognizing potential dangers, spill suppression, Last Minute Risk Assessment (LMRA), muster points.

Personal protective equipment (PPE): An overview of the requirements and certification on PPE. Specific circumstances under which regular and/or specialized PPE is required and how to use it.
 CSA certified PPE, identification of hazardous circumstances that would either require standard and/or specialized PPE.

Standard PPE consists of (but is not restricted to) Coveralls, Hard Hat, Safety Glasses, Steel Toe Boots, Reflective Vest, Gloves

Specialised PPE consists of (but is not restricted to) dust masks, respirators, Ear Plugs, Hazmat Suits, Fall Protection

Safety devices on site: a list of the stagnant and also functioning devices set in place to prevent, mitigate and/or control hazardous circumstances.
 Fire alarm, fire extinguisher, spill kits, emergency stop, leak detectors, breakaway, shear valves, tank/dispenser monitoring system.

Fire safety: safe practices designed to prevent and/or control an on site fire.
 Trained use of a fire extinguisher, use of spill prevention practices, elemental knowledge of a fire and the circumstantial required actions needed to be taken in the event of.

Safety Requirements & Certification: the specific / non-specific listed safe work training and certification necessary for safe practices in the Petroleum field.
 Post, Fall Protection, Confined Entry, API, First Aid, WHMIS, machinery tickets specific for work to be done (i.e. "forklift ticket"), Fire Extinguisher/Safety training, Transportation of Dangerous Goods (TDG).

Documentation: the required record of pre-shift inspections, accidents and/or injury's.
 Job Safety Analysis (JSA), Near Miss, Confined Entry, WCB forms.

Manufacturers and materials 
Within the petroleum trade, multiple manufacturers for the industry design and build numerous components of the petroleum industry. Some manufacturers are more frequently used and well known then others, such as:

 OPW which designs and manufacturers nozzles, fuel hose components, and underground tank components. OPW
 Gilbarco/Veeder-Root, this is a manufacturer of pump dispensers, underground monitoring equipment, and point of sales payment systems. Gilbarco / Veeder-Root
 Red Jacket/FE Petro, both well known manufacturers of Submersible Turbine Pumps (STP’s) which are used to supply fuel from the tanks to the dispensers. Also a manufacturer of flex fuel pipe. STP
 Dresser Wayne which is a manufacturer of retail and fleet fuel dispensers and dispenser components, and Automatic Tank Gauges. Dresser Wayne
 PD McLaren which is a manufacturer of high speed and low speed fuel dispensers used in fleets and commercial cardlock applications. PD McLaren
 Tokheim Which is one of the world’s leading manufacturers of fuel dispensers. Tokheim
 Swivel Joints which is one of the largest distributors of custom swivel joints, drylok couplers and Kamvalok Couplers in North America. Swivel Joints

There are many other manufacturers that are used by Petroleum Technicians, but these are few examples of the petroleum equipment manufacturers. The Petroleum Technician and Installer trade consists of electrical and mechanical equipment, so there are many manufacturers that they must use for each specific thing. For example, with the electrical components the equipment must be explosion proof, and with mechanical components one is dealing with multiple types of piping material such as plastic, Sched 40 BP masters metallic, cast iron, and threaded, as well as the pumping and valve systems.

See also
 Petroleum industry in Canada

References

Petroleum industry in Canada
Technicians